Alexander Marian Bradshaw  (born 12 July 1944 Bushey) is a British physicist. He was scientific director of the Max Planck Institute for Plasma Physics, from 1999 to 2008.

He earned a PhD from University of London in 1969, and habilitation from Technical University Munich in 1974. He is also notable for his work with D. Phil Woodruff, on photoelectron diffraction.

References

External links

British physicists
1944 births
People from Bushey
Alumni of the University of London
Technical University of Munich alumni
Max Planck Society people
Academic staff of the Technical University of Munich
Fellows of the Royal Society
Living people
Commanders of the Order of the British Empire
Recipients of the Cross of the Order of Merit of the Federal Republic of Germany
Presidents of the German Physical Society
Max Planck Institute directors